Deborah Lynne Fuller (born 24 June 1966) is a former competition diver who represented Canada at two consecutive Summer Olympics, starting in 1984.  She won a bronze medal at the 1987 Pan American Games in and two gold medals at the 1986 Commonwealth Games.

Early years 

Fuller was born in Montreal, Quebec.  Her older sister, Wendy Fuller, also competed as an international diver.

Education 

Fuller accepted an athletic scholarship to attend the University of Florida in Gainesville, Florida, where she dove for coach Randy Reese's Florida Gators swimming and diving team in National Collegiate Athletic Association (NCAA) competition from 1984 to 1987.  She was recognized as an All-American four times during her American college career, and won the Southeastern Conference (SEC) individual championship in the one-meter springboard diving event in 1985.

See also 

 Florida Gators
 List of University of Florida alumni
 List of University of Florida Olympians

References 

1966 births
Living people
Anglophone Quebec people
Canadian female divers
Commonwealth Games gold medallists for Canada
Divers at the 1984 Summer Olympics
Divers at the 1986 Commonwealth Games
Divers at the 1988 Summer Olympics
Florida Gators women's swimmers
Olympic divers of Canada
Divers from Montreal
Pan American Games bronze medalists for Canada
Commonwealth Games medallists in diving
Pan American Games medalists in diving
Divers at the 1987 Pan American Games
Medalists at the 1987 Pan American Games
Medallists at the 1986 Commonwealth Games